Ardoreosomus (meaning: "tropical body") is an extinct genus of ray-finned fish. It was described from the Induan aged Candelaria Formation of Nevada, United States, which was located near the equator during the Early Triassic epoch. It contains only one species, A. occidentalis (monotypy). 

Ardoreosomus is a ptycholepiform, closely resembling Boreosomus and Ptycholepis; however, Ardoreosomus is distinguished from other ptycholepiforms in having a more strongly angled hyomandibula and lacking an opercular process, among other features.

See also

 Prehistoric fish
 List of prehistoric bony fish
 Paleontology in Nevada

References

Prehistoric ray-finned fish genera